State Route 39 (SR 39) is a state highway in the U.S. state of California that travels through Orange and Los Angeles counties. Its southern terminus is at Pacific Coast Highway (SR 1), in Huntington Beach. SR 39's northern terminus is at Islip Saddle on Angeles Crest Highway (SR 2) in the Angeles National Forest, but its northernmost  segment (including the connection with SR 2) has been closed to public highway traffic since 1978 due to a massive mud and rockslide.

Officially, the highway is broken into pieces. Caltrans has not adopted or signed the segment between La Habra and West Covina. Caltrans has also relinquished a portion of SR 39 in Buena Park from Stanton Avenue in Buena Park to Interstate 5 in 2013, as well as those segments within the cities of Azusa by 2010, Covina by 2010, and West Covina by 2013. Since 2001, a portion of SR 39 that runs through the city of Stanton has been considered for relinquishment to the city. If so, the portion that runs through the city of Anaheim will still be state controlled.

Major places of interest along SR 39 are Knott's Berry Farm, an amusement park, Adventure City, another amusement park targeted for children, Huntington Beach, a local beach, a Medieval Times location, the Buena Park Auto Center, and the Westridge Golf Course in La Habra.

Route description
SR 39 begins at SR 1 (Pacific Coast Highway) in Huntington Beach and runs north along Beach Boulevard to Whittier Boulevard in La Habra, with the exception of the segment between the southern city limit of Buena Park and Interstate 5, which was relinquished to the city in 2013. SR 39 then turns east along Whittier Boulevard to Harbor Boulevard, taking over a former segment of SR 72, while the remaining segment SR 72 remains on Whittier Boulevard west of Beach Boulevard.

The segment from the Whittier–Harbor intersection to the San Bernardino Freeway (Interstate 10) in West Covina is not officially designated by Caltrans (as indicated by an "END 39" sign at the Whittier–Harbor intersection). Under California Streets and Highways Code § 339 (d), the traversable route takes SR 39 along Harbor Boulevard north, Fullerton Road north, and then Colima Road west to Azusa Avenue in Hacienda Heights. SR 39 would then continue north on Azusa Avenue through the City of Industry to Interstate 10.

Adopted SR 39 then resumes and signs for SR 39 appear on Azusa Avenue from its junction with Interstate 10 in West Covina, and through Covina to First Street in the city of Azusa just north of Interstate 210. The route then runs as a couplet (composed of two one-way streets), with northbound traffic on Azusa Avenue, and southbound traffic on San Gabriel Avenue, to Sierra Madre Avenue where the two one-way streets converge to form San Gabriel Canyon Road. Although relinquished in the cities of West Covina, Covina, and Azusa, SR 39 shields remain on this segment of the highway.

State maintenance of SR 39 begins again along San Gabriel Canyon Road at the north limit of Azusa. The last few miles of the route, including the connection to SR 2, are closed to public highway traffic, as the roadbed has been closed since 1978, due to major rock slides that year and again in 2005 which damaged more of the remaining roadbed. Although Google Maps and other mapping services may list this section of the road as an "available" route to connect to SR 2, this section actually remains closed.

A replacement of the section north of East Fork Road, in the next canyon to the east, was partly built in 1936 and 1961, but was never completed. The section includes one bridge and two tunnels; it was never used by automobile or truck traffic. In one local hiking guide the section is identified as the "Road to Nowhere" and the "Convict Road", although the official name is the Shoemaker Road and was planned to be an escape route in times of nuclear warfare. A ca. 1967 replacement, much closer to the existing alignment, was also stopped prematurely, and so the middle of the segment between East Fork Road and the closure gate, with its many hairpin curves, still exists.

SR 39 is part of the California Freeway and Expressway System, and the urban portions of SR 39 are part of the National Highway System, a network of highways that are considered essential to the country's economy, defense, and mobility by the Federal Highway Administration. SR 39 is eligible for the State Scenic Highway System, but it is not officially designated as a scenic highway by the California Department of Transportation.

History

La Habra to West Covina connection
Although defined to be a continuous route in the California Streets and Highway Code, the segment from Whittier Boulevard in La Habra to West Covina is not officially adopted or signed by Caltrans. This is indicated at the intersection of Whittier Boulevard and Harbor Boulevard, where an "END 39" sign appears.

Prior to the present before reaching Harbor Boulevard, SR 39 continued north from Whittier Boulevard along Hacienda Road to the Los Angeles/Orange County line then north on Hacienda Boulevard and Glendora Avenue to US 60, 70, and 99 (Garvey Avenue, now Interstate 10) in West Covina. It then continued east with US 60, 70, and 99 to Azusa Avenue where it turned north to follow the present alignment as described beginning in the fourth paragraph of the preceding section. The Hacienda Glendora segment can still be seen as Route 39 on some maps.

Prior to 1991, Harbor Boulevard became Fullerton Road northbound from the Los Angeles/Orange County Line, through the Puente Hills as a one-lane winding road into Rowland Heights. However, due to complaints of nearby residents due to the increased volume of traffic, a straighter, wider stub was built slightly to the east, and was named Harbor Boulevard. This route is under consideration to become part of SR 39 to complete the gap.

The new Harbor Boulevard was opened to the public early in 1992, and is now the primary corridor between Orange County and Rowland Heights, although the original winding Fullerton Road segment still exists as a strictly residential street.

The definition of Route 39 in the California Streets and Highway Code was thus changed accordingly, and the traversable route to fill the Route 39 gap would be via Harbor Boulevard north, Fullerton Road north, and then Colima Road west to Azusa Avenue in Hacienda Heights. Route 39 would then continue north on Azusa Avenue through the City of Industry to Interstate 10 in West Covina. This segment however has yet to be officially designated by Caltrans.

Closed northern segment to Islip Saddle

The northernmost  stretch of SR 39, from Snow Springs north of Azusa to SR 2 at Islip Saddle, has been closed to public vehicle traffic since 1978 due to a massive mud and rockslide. While the road is passable to emergency vehicles for the entire closed length, sections near reoccurring rock slides have become narrow dirt roads which are not suitable for passenger vehicles.  According to Caltrans officials, it will take three years to complete the repairs.

People heading to nearby Mount Waterman must instead travel west to Pasadena and join SR 2 in La Cañada Flintridge - a nearly two-hour trip. Reopening SR 39 would cut the drive-time to the Waterman ski area in half and shorten the trip east to Wrightwood.

The segment was opened to emergency crews in February 2003 after a Caltrans study showed reopening it would not harm wetlands, air and water quality, natural vegetation or threatened plants and animals.

On July 10, 2006, the Pasadena Star-News reported that the state provided funding for an Environmental Impact Report (EIR) in June 2006 to assess the feasibility of reopening the highway in the Angeles National Forest.

According to the Caltrans District Seven "Inside Seven" newsletter, work was to continue through 2009 and 2010 on reconstruction and installation of features to prevent future slides from damaging the roadway:

However, due to budgetary issues, by 2012 Caltrans was instead trying to transfer responsibility for the entirety of SR 39 north of postmile LA 17.81 (including the closed section) to either the U.S. Forest Service or Los Angeles County, both of which declined, also for financial reasons, even though both the USFS and the county deem the route "essential". Abandoning the route would also not be cost-effective for Caltrans due, among other reasons, to federal environmental restoration requirements related to the presence of bighorn sheep. The proposal was abandoned after opposition by local residents and the county, as well as substantial legal pressure by the Forest Service, who threatened to enforce an old contract that requires Caltrans to completely deconstruct the highway should it refuse to maintain it. There are proposals to move the closed gate north two miles to a popular trailhead.

On December 15, 2022, Caltrans held a meeting to consider several proposed plans to reopen SR 39. Proposals include a full restoration, minimal restoration for emergency services, a single-lane road, or recreational use. Under the recreational use proposal, the restored route would be closed to general traffic, but would allow for hiking, biking, and other recreational activities.

Major intersections

See also

References

External links

 California @ AARoads.com - State Route 39
 Caltrans: Route 39 highway conditions
 California Highways: SR 39
 Michael Ballard on SR 39
 SR 39 EIR

039
State Route 039
State Route 039
Angeles National Forest
Anaheim, California
Azusa, California
Buena Park, California
Covina, California
Fullerton, California
Garden Grove, California
Huntington Beach, California
La Habra, California
La Mirada, California
Stanton, California
Westminster, California
West Covina, California